Distant is an unincorporated community in Armstrong County, Pennsylvania, United States. Distant has a post office with ZIP code 16224.

History
A post office called Oakland was established in 1841 and continued operation until 1907. The post office called Distant that remains was established in 1917. Oakland P.O. appears in the 1876 Atlas of Armstrong County, Pennsylvania. The founding of the town of Oakland, formerly Texas, is detailed in Chapter 15 of the 1883 History of Armstrong County Pennsylvania.

References

Unincorporated communities in Armstrong County, Pennsylvania
Unincorporated communities in Pennsylvania